"Cape Cod Kwassa Kwassa" is the fourth single by indie rock band Vampire Weekend, released 18 August 2008. The song was rated 67th best song of 2008 by Rolling Stone magazine.

Background
In 2005, Vampire Weekend vocalist Ezra Koenig travelled through London en route to India and said that the trip got him "thinking a lot about colonialism and the aesthetic connections between preppy culture and the native cultures of places like Africa and India." This inspired Koenig to write a short story exploring those connections, and called it "Cape Cod Kwassa Kwassa", after which the song was named. "Kwassa kwassa" refers to a dance rhythm from Congo (DRC).

Music video
The video, directed by British comedian Richard Ayoade (who had also directed the band's video for "Oxford Comma") and set in the 1980s, was filmed in Spring Lake, New Jersey at Kaitlin Files' shore house. It is the first video where Vampire Weekend consciously decided to use a narrative with the band becoming characters, unlike previous videos which were "fairly abstract [with] no narrative." Koenig said he felt there was "a Tim Burton element" to the video, in which the band reinvented their image as goths, "with white faces, spiked hair and black outfits." The characters were created in 2007 by Koenig, who came up with rough ideas and images, and was helped by Ayoade to create a story from them.

Bass guitarist Chris Baio said that the band devotes a lot of time to touring, so "when [they] do something different like this, it is an exciting thing." Keyboardist Rostam Batmanglij said that the band is "interested in visuals, and it's a treat for [them] to get to do this."

Cover versions
"I actually do like that song a lot," said Peter Gabriel, "and they've asked me to sing a version of it now which I may well do." Koenig said, "That's an idea that's been floated around before 'cause it seems so perfect. But yeah, it looks like it's happening." He added that the band didn't want to confirm the new version until it appeared on iTunes Store.

Asked about the lyric that references him ("This feels so unnatural, Peter Gabriel, too"), Gabriel told 6Music, "I haven't quite worked that out whether I should be doing that or substituting it with a name." He ended up replacing one of the lines with "And it feels so unnatural to sing your own name" when the cover was released with Hot Chip providing the instrumental.

"Richard Russell [head of the XL label] is a dad at my son's school," Gabriel explained to Mark Blake, "and he said, 'I have this young band and they are mentioning you as an influence.' … I could hear a lot of Talking Heads in there… When they wanted to involve me in this remix, I didn't know if it was a bit too weird to sing my own name, so I changed it. But I think Vampire Weekend are very smart songwriters."

Swedish artist Lykke Li also often performs the song during concerts.

Critical reception
MusicOMH commented that the beginning of "Cape Cod Kwassa Kwassa" sounds "as if imitating 1950s calypso" and described the opening hook as having "innocence [that] adds charm to the track, built on by the breezy vocal." Pitchfork Media said that the song's "instrumentation and bubbly beat evoke Paul Simon's Graceland and "transforms the buoyant spirit of "Diamonds on the Soles of Her Shoes" to a cheaply (but cleanly) recorded, stripped-down, no-fuss context." Pitchfork also said that "the unassuming nature of the production works in Vampire Weekend's favor, allowing subtle pleasures like that sunny falsetto vocalese at the end and the purity of the guitar tone to shine through."

Track list
Digital Download (iTunes):
"Cape Cod Kwassa Kwassa" (radio edit) – 3:32
"Cape Cod Kwassa Kwassa" (The Very Best remix) – 3:26

Digital Download (Rhapsody):
"Cape Cod Kwassa Kwassa" (live) – 3:35

Personnel
Vampire Weekend
Ezra Koenig
Rostam Batmanglij
Christopher Tomson
Chris Baio

Additional musicians
 Jeff Curtin – hand drums, shaker

Technical
 Emily Lazar – mastering
 Rostam Batmanglij – mixing

Chart positions

Following the success of "A-Punk" and "Oxford Comma," Vampire Weekend decided to release "Cape Cod Kwassa Kwassa" as the fourth single from the album. Originally released in 2008, the song failed to make much of an impact on the UK Singles Chart, peaking at #178. The single was not released in America, meaning along with "Mansard Roof," the single was rather unsuccessful.

References

External links

2008 singles
Vampire Weekend songs
2008 songs
XL Recordings singles
Songs written by Rostam Batmanglij
Songs written by Ezra Koenig
Songs written by Chris Baio
Songs written by Chris Tomson